Atlético Madrid Balonmano was a handball team that was part of the Atlético sports organization.

History
Created in the early 1950s, it won 11 Spanish Leagues and 10 Spanish Cups between 1952 and 1987, and reached the final of the 1984-85 European Cup and the 1986-87 EHF Cup; they lost both to, respectively, Metaloplastika Šabac and Granitas Kaunas.

Jesús Gil disbanded the team in 1992, but it still competed as Atlético Madrid Alcobendas for two more seasons under the management of some stockholders before finally disappearing in 1994.

Los Colchoneros welcomed handball back into their organization in 2011, as they became official sponsors of BM Neptuno, formerly known as BM Ciudad Real, which folded and relocated to Madrid for financial reasons. The new team started off quite successfully, beating FC Barcelona Handbol 33–26 in the Supercup match in August 2011.

Trophies
Liga ASOBAL:
Champions: (11). 1951-52, 1953–54, 1961–62, 1962–63, 1963–64, 1964–65, 1978–79, 1980–81, 1982–83, 1983–84, 1984–85.
Runners-Up: (13).  1955-56, 1958–59, 1960–61, 1965–66, 1966–67, 1969–70, 1971–72, 1973–74, 1975–76, 1976–77, 1977–78, 1981–82, 1985–86.
Copa del Rey:
Champions: (10). 1962, 1963, 1966, 1967, 1968, 1978, 1979, 1981, 1982, 1987
Runners-Up: (7).  1970, 1973, 1976, 1980, 1984, 1985, 1991.
Supercopa ASOBAL:
Champions: (2). 1986, 1988.
EHF Champions League
Runners-Up: (1). 1984–85.
EHF Cup
Runners-Up: (1). 1986–87.
 Double
 Winners (4): 1961–62, 1962–63, 1978–79, 1980–81

Home arenas

Notable players

 Alberto Urdiales
 Cecilio Alonso
 José Javier Hombrados
 Mateo Garralda
 "Papitu"
 Lorenzo Rico
 Javier Reino
 Ángel Hermida
 Ricardo Marín
 Tomas Svensson
 Per Carlén
 Veselin Vuković
 Sigurður Sveinsson
 Igor Butulija
 Dejan Perić
 Dragan Škrbić
 Mikael Strøm
 Tibor Vozar
 Neculai Vasilcă
 Igor Vasilev
 Steven Goss
 Adnan Šabanović
 Norwin Platzer

Notables coaches
Jordi Álvaro
Juan de Dios Román
Domingo Bárcenas
Francisco Parrilla

See also
Atlético Madrid
BM Neptuno

References

Spanish handball clubs
Defunct handball clubs
Atlético Madrid
Handball clubs established in 1951
Handball clubs disestablished in 1994
1951 establishments in Spain
1994 disestablishments in Spain
Sports teams in Madrid